Neo Drift Out: New Technology is a 1996 rallying video game developed by Visco Corporation for the Neo Geo and Neo Geo CD. It is the fourth title in the Drift Out series. Though it follows Super Drift Out: World Rally Championships, it is closer to the earlier Drift Out '94: The Hard Order.  

In Neo Drift Out: New Technology, players race through various tracks in high-speed cars, competing against other drivers. The game features a variety of modes, including a single-player campaign and a multiplayer mode in which up to two players can race against each other. 

Neo Drift Out: New Technology received positive reviews upon release, with many praising its smooth gameplay and challenging AI opponents. It is considered a classic of the racing genre and is still popular among fans of retro gaming.

Gameplay 

This is an arcade-style rallying game with an isometric view. To start things off, the player chooses between three Japanese rally-spec vehicles—the Mitsubishi Lancer, the Subaru Impreza, and the Toyota Celica—which vary with their Speed, Control, and Body stats.

In each racing stage, the player needs to get to the finish line in the shortest time possible. If the clock hits zero, the player loses and the game is over unless they can continue. While driving, the player's time is hindered by barrels, puddles, slippery ice, cones and other obstacles that are in the player's path. Even other cars driving can be an obstacle. Also the player has to keep their rally car straight when driving up slopes, or the car will swerve and crash. The player can gain more time if they make it through checkpoints in between the starting and finishing points. The player can also take shortcuts. Before making a turn, the player will always get an immediate warning on the screen with a voice saying which direction the player ought to turn along with certain other warnings.

Aside from the starting Practice stage, there are six other stages to be conquered: European, African, Snow Land, Southern Hemisphere, Scandinavian, and Great Britain.

Development and release

Reception 

Neo Drift Out: New Technology was met with generally positive reception from critics. AllGames Paul Biondich praised its intuitive but difficult-to-master gameplay and speed but criticized the audiovisual presentation for being standard and uninspired. MAN!ACs Andreas Knauf reviewed the Neo Geo CD version and commended its fast gameplay but regarded the sound design as "unimportant" and the graphics to be better than the original Drift Out. Brazilian magazine Super Game Power compared the game with Power Drive Rally, giving high remarks to the graphics, sound, controls and fun factor.

In 2014, HobbyConsolas identified Neo Drift Out as one of the twenty best games for the Neo Geo CD. Likewise Time Extension also listed it as one of the best games for the Neo Geo.

Notes

References

External links 
 Neo Drift Out: New Technology at GameFAQs
 Neo Drift Out: New Technology at Giant Bomb
 Neo Drift Out: New Technology at Killer List of Videogames
 Neo Drift Out: New Technology at MobyGames

1996 video games
Arcade video games
Drift Out series
Multiplayer and single-player video games
Neo Geo games
Neo Geo CD games
Off-road racing video games
SNK games
Video game sequels
Video games set in Africa
Video games set in England
Visco Corporation games
Video games developed in Japan